Glycoproteinosis are lysosomal storage diseases affecting glycoproteins, resulting from defects in lysosomal function. The term is sometimes reserved for conditions involving degradation of glycoproteins.

Types
 (E77.0) Defects in post-translational modification of lysosomal enzymes
 Mucolipidosis II (I-cell disease)
 Mucolipidosis III (pseudo-Hurler polydystrophy)
 (E77.1) Defects in glycoprotein degradation
 Aspartylglucosaminuria
 Fucosidosis
 Mannosidosis
 Sialidosis (mucolipidosis I)

Another type, recently characterized, is galactosialidosis.

References

External links 

 NIH

Glycoprotein metabolism disorders